James Herbert Case Jr. (1906-1965) was the 8th president of Washington & Jefferson College.

Case was born on October 26, 1906, in Plainfield, New Jersey He graduated from Princeton University in 1929 and served with the United States Navy Later, he served as secretary of Brown University.

He was elected president of Washington & Jefferson College on May 4, 1946, and inaugurated October 25, 1946. Fall 1946 saw the largest student body on record, 1047, with 75% of the students veterans of World War II The college added a Division of Engineering in the former Catholic Church on the corner of Wheeling and South Lincoln Streets. On October 29, 1949, the college dedicated Mellon and Upperclass Dormitories. In June 1949, the Board of Trustees granted Case a one-year leave of absence to study the problems of small, independent, liberal arts colleges. On March 25, 1950, before the end of his leave, he resigned to take the presidency of Bard College. He died in New York Hospital on July 11, 1965, after a long illness.

See also

 Washington & Jefferson College
 President of Washington & Jefferson College

References

1906 births
1965 deaths
People from Plainfield, New Jersey
Princeton University alumni
Presidents of Washington & Jefferson College
20th-century American academics